Zavino is a small village in the hills south of the Vipava Valley in the Municipality of Ajdovščina in the Littoral region of Slovenia.

Name
Zavino was first attested in written sources in 1763–87 as Svina. The name is derived from *Svinjino (selo)—literally, 'pig (village)'—indicating that the people of the village raised pigs. The form Zavino was an artificial modification of the name to avoid the association with pigs, but the original root is still preserved in the name of Svinjšček Creek, which runs west of the village. Local variations of the village name include Svinino, Svinno, and (dissimilated) Svilno. See also Sinja Gorica, Svino, and Vinje pri Moravčah for similar names.

References

External links 

Zavino at Geopedia

Populated places in the Municipality of Ajdovščina